This is a list of defunct airlines of Ukraine.

See also

 List of airlines of Ukraine
 List of airports in Ukraine

References

 01
defunct airlines
Ukraine
Airlines, defunct
Airlines, Defunct
.x-defunct